"Calendar Boys" is an episode of the BBC sitcom, The Green Green Grass. It was screened on 22 January 2009, as the third episode of the fourth series.

Synopsis

Marlene is bored with life on the farm, so she throws herself into charity work. As a result of her efforts, Boycie realises that a big enough charity donation could get him a knighthood. To raise money Marlene's new found photography skills appear as she creates a calendar called Calendar Boys, based on the popular film Calendar Girls, featuring all the men on the farm including Elgin, Bryan and Jed almost naked, a photoshopped Boycie, and some characters from Only Fools and Horses such as Denzil and Trigger. Tyler and his friends watch the internet release of the calendar, only to find the December picture is him, photoshopped.

Boycie meets an upper class MP, Tristram. Boycie overhears him talking, and, after coming to false conclusions, believes that he can use this new acquaintance to gain himself a knighthood. However, this is not the case. Unbeknown to Boycie, Tristram is bisexual, and is only interested in heterosexual Boycie in a homosexual way, encouraged by a series of misunderstandings.

Episode cast

Production, broadcast and reception

Broadcast
This episode was broadcast on 22 January 2009 at 8:30, on BBC1.

Writer and cast
This episode was written by David Cantor, his first episode of the fourth series. This episode also has the largest cast since From Here to Paternity.

Continuity
References to Denzil and Trigger are made after they posed nude for Marlene's calendar.
Colin Cakeworthy is made reference to again, posing for Marlene's calendar.
Tyler's band, Puddle of Agony, appears again.

Viewership
3.86 million

Notes
Sir Tristram's wife is referred to as Lady Veronica – this is probably an error (see forms of address in the United Kingdom). Similarly, if Boycie were knighted, Marlene would become "Lady Boyce", not "Lady Marlene".

References

British TV Comedy Guide for The Green Green Grass
BARB viewing figures

2009 British television episodes
The Green Green Grass episodes